The black wrasse (Halichoeres adustus) is a species of wrasse native to the eastern Pacific Ocean around Cocos Island, the Revillagigedo Islands, Tres Marias Islands, and the Galapagos. It can reach  in total length.

References

Black wrasse
Fish described in 1890
Taxa named by Charles Henry Gilbert